Canned may refer to:

 "Canned", an episode of Rocko's Modern Life
 Canning of food
 Dismissal (employment) 
 Drunkenness
  produced and conserved to be released on demand, e.g. 
 Canned air
 Canned hunt
 Canned laughter
 Canned response

See also

Canned Carrott
Canned Heat
Canned music (disambiguation)